The 1989 Trans America Athletic Conference men's basketball tournament (now known as the ASUN men's basketball tournament) was held March 7–9 at Barton Coliseum in Little Rock, Arkansas.

Arkansas–Little Rock easily defeated  in the championship game, 100–72, to win their second TAAC/Atlantic Sun men's basketball tournament. The Trojans, therefore, received an automatic bid to the 1989 NCAA tournament, where they lost to Louisville in the first round.

For the third straight year, only the top eight teams (out of 10) in the conference standings were invited to the tournament.

Bracket

References

ASUN men's basketball tournament
Tournament
TAAC men's basketball tournament
TAAC men's basketball tournament